Robert Oliphant (1 December 1864 – 18 January 1956) was a New Zealand rugby union player. A wing-forward, Oliphant represented Manawatu, Wellington, Auckland and Hawke's Bay at a provincial level, and was a member of the New Zealand national side, the All Blacks, in 1893 and 1896. He played three games for the All Blacks but did not appear in any test matches.

In 1897, Oliphant was awarded the silver medal of the Royal Humane Society of Australasia for saving a girl, Margaret Purnell, from drowning in Auckland Harbour on 29 May 1896.

Following the death of Sir Henry Braddon in 1955, Oliphant held the distinction of being the oldest living All Black. He died on 18 January 1956 in Auckland and was buried at O'Neill's Point Cemetery in Bayswater.

In January 1915, Oliphant volunteered for the New Zealand Expeditionary Force and gave his date of birth as 22 January 1872, but it is likely that he falsified this so that he would be considered young enough for service. He served in Samoa throughout the war, reaching the rank of armourer sergeant.

References

1864 births
1956 deaths
People from Omagh
Irish emigrants to New Zealand (before 1923)
New Zealand rugby union players
New Zealand international rugby union players
Manawatu rugby union players
Auckland rugby union players
Wellington rugby union players
Hawke's Bay rugby union players
Rugby union wing-forwards
New Zealand military personnel of World War I
Burials at O'Neill's Point Cemetery
New Zealand people of Scottish descent
Irish people of Scottish descent
Rugby union players from County Tyrone